Rhodopis can refer to:

 Rhodopis, an ancient Egyptian folk tale and precursor to Cinderella
 Rhodopis (hetaera), ancient Greek courtesan mentioned by Herodotus who may underlie the Rhodopis story
 Rhodopis and Euthynicus, pair of mythical hunters devoted to Artemis

Rhodopis may also be part of the following scientific names:
 Rhodopis, a genus of birds with the oasis hummingbird (Rhodopis vesper) as its only living member
 Rhodopis (plant), genus of legumes
 Craugastor rhodopis, a species of frog
 The Rhodopes or Rhodope Mountains, mountain in South-east Europe in the area of ancient Trace, now on the border of Greece and Bulgaria

Genus disambiguation pages